This is a list of the bird species recorded in Papua New Guinea. The avifauna of Papua New Guinea include a total of 897 species, of which 103 are endemic, and 2 have been introduced by humans. 44 species are globally threatened.

This list's taxonomic treatment (designation and sequence of orders, families and species) and nomenclature (common and scientific names) follow the conventions of The Clements Checklist of Birds of the World, 2022 edition. The family accounts at the beginning of each heading reflect this taxonomy, as do the species counts in each family account. Introduced and accidental species are included in the total counts for Papua New Guinea.

The following tags have been used to highlight several categories. The commonly occurring native species do not fall into any of these categories.

(A) Accidental - a species that rarely or accidentally occurs in Papua New Guinea
(E) Endemic - a species that is native only to Papua New Guinea
(I) Introduced - a species introduced to Papua New Guinea as a consequence, direct or indirect, of human actions

Cassowaries and emu
Order: StruthioniformesFamily: Casuariidae

The cassowaries are large flightless birds native to Australia and New Guinea.

Southern cassowary, Casuarius casuarius
Dwarf cassowary, Casuarius bennetti
Northern cassowary, Casuarius unappendiculatus

Magpie goose
Order: AnseriformesFamily: Anseranatidae

The family contains a single species, the magpie goose. It was an early and distinctive offshoot of the anseriform family tree, diverging after the screamers and before all other ducks, geese and swans, sometime in the late Cretaceous.

Magpie goose, Anseranas semipalmata

Ducks, geese, and waterfowl
Order: AnseriformesFamily: Anatidae

Anatidae includes the ducks and most duck-like waterfowl, such as geese and swans. These birds are adapted to an aquatic existence with webbed feet, flattened bills, and feathers that are excellent at shedding water due to an oily coating.

Spotted whistling-duck, Dendrocygna guttata
Plumed whistling-duck, Dendrocygna eytoni
Wandering whistling-duck, Dendrocygna arcuata
Black swan, Cygnus atratus (A)
Radjah shelduck, Radjah radjah
Green pygmy-goose, Nettapus pulchellus
Cotton pygmy-goose, Nettapus coromandelianus
Maned duck, Chenonetta jubata (A)
Salvadori's teal, Salvadorina waigiuensis (E)
Garganey, Spatula querquedula
Northern shoveler, Spatula clypeata (A)
Eurasian wigeon, Mareca penelope
Pacific black duck, Anas superciliosa
Northern pintail, Anas acuta
Sunda teal, Anas gibberifrons
Gray teal, Anas gracilis
Hardhead, Aythya australis
Tufted duck, Aythya fuligula (A)

Megapodes
Order: GalliformesFamily: Megapodiidae

The Megapodiidae are stocky, medium-large chicken-like birds with small heads and large feet. All but the malleefowl occupy jungle habitats and most have brown or black colouring.

Wattled brushturkey, Aepypodius arfakianus
Yellow-legged brushturkey, Talegalla fuscirostris
Red-legged brushturkey, Talegalla jobiensis
Dusky scrubfowl, Megapodius freycinet
Melanesian scrubfowl, Megapodius eremita
New Guinea scrubfowl, Megapodius affinis
Orange-footed scrubfowl, Megapodius reinwardt

Pheasants, grouse, and allies
Order: GalliformesFamily: Phasianidae

The Phasianidae are a family of terrestrial birds. In general, they are plump (although they vary in size) and have broad, relatively short wings.

Brown quail, Synoicus ypsilophorus
Blue-breasted quail, Synoicus chinensis
Snow Mountain quail, Synoicus monorthonyx
Red junglefowl, Gallus gallus

Grebes
Order: PodicipediformesFamily: Podicipedidae

Grebes are small to medium-large freshwater diving birds. They have lobed toes and are excellent swimmers and divers. However, they have their feet placed far back on the body, making them quite ungainly on land.

Little grebe, Tachybaptus ruficollis
Australasian grebe, Tachybaptus novaehollandiae

Pigeons and doves
Order: ColumbiformesFamily: Columbidae

Pigeons and doves are stout-bodied birds with short necks and short slender bills with a fleshy cere.

Rock pigeon, Columba livia
Metallic pigeon, Columba vitiensis
Yellow-legged pigeon, Columba pallidiceps
Spotted dove, Spilopelia chinensis (A)
Amboyna cuckoo-dove, Macropygia amboinensis
Sultan's cuckoo-dove, Macropygia doreya
Black-billed cuckoo-dove, Macropygia nigrirostris
Mackinlay's cuckoo-dove, Macropygia mackinlayi
Great cuckoo-dove, Reinwardtoena reinwardti
Pied cuckoo-dove, Reinwardtoena browni (E)
Crested cuckoo-dove, Reinwardtoena crassirostris
Pacific emerald dove, Chalcophaps longirostris
Stephan's dove, Chalcophaps stephani
New Guinea bronzewing, Henicophaps albifrons
New Britain bronzewing, Henicophaps foersteri (E)
Bronze ground dove, Alopecoenas beccarii
White-bibbed ground dove, Alopecoenas jobiensis
Zebra dove, Geopelia striata
Peaceful dove, Geopelia placida
Bar-shouldered dove, Geopelia humeralis
Nicobar pigeon, Caloenas nicobarica
Cinnamon ground dove, Gallicolumba rufigula
Thick-billed ground-pigeon, Trugon terrestris
Pheasant pigeon, Otidiphaps nobilis
Western crowned-pigeon, Goura cristata
Sclater's crowned-pigeon, Goura sclaterii
Scheepmaker's crowned-pigeon, Goura scheepmakeri (E)
Victoria crowned-pigeon, Goura victoria
Wompoo fruit-dove, Ptilinopus magnificus
Pink-spotted fruit-dove, Ptilinopus perlatus
Ornate fruit-dove, Ptilinopus ornatus
Orange-fronted fruit-dove, Ptilinopus aurantiifrons
Superb fruit-dove, Ptilinopus superbus
Rose-crowned fruit-dove, Ptilinopus regina
Coroneted fruit-dove, Ptilinopus coronulatus
Beautiful fruit-dove, Ptilinopus pulchellus
White-breasted fruit-dove, Ptilinopus rivoli
Yellow-bibbed fruit-dove, Ptilinopus solomonensis
Claret-breasted fruit-dove, Ptilinopus viridis
Orange-bellied fruit-dove, Ptilinopus iozonus
Knob-billed fruit-dove, Ptilinopus insolitus (E)
Dwarf fruit-dove, Ptilinopus nainus
Spectacled imperial-pigeon, Ducula perspicillata (A)
Elegant imperial-pigeon, Ducula concinna (A)
Pacific imperial-pigeon, Ducula pacifica
Red-knobbed imperial-pigeon, Ducula rubricera
Purple-tailed imperial-pigeon, Ducula rufigaster
Finsch's imperial-pigeon, Ducula finschii (E)
Rufescent imperial-pigeon, Ducula chalconota
Island imperial-pigeon, Ducula pistrinaria
Pinon's imperial-pigeon, Ducula pinon
Bismarck imperial-pigeon, Ducula melanochroa (E)
Collared imperial-pigeon, Ducula mullerii
Zoe's imperial-pigeon, Ducula zoeae
Pied imperial-pigeon, Ducula bicolor
Yellowish imperial-pigeon, Ducula subflavescens (E)
Torresian imperial-pigeon, Ducula spilorrhoa
Topknot pigeon, Lopholaimus antarcticus
Papuan mountain-pigeon, Gymnophaps albertisii
Pale mountain-pigeon, Gymnophaps solomonensis (E)

Bustards
Order: OtidiformesFamily: Otididae

Bustards are large terrestrial birds mainly associated with dry open country and steppes in the Old World. They are omnivorous and nest on the ground. They walk steadily on strong legs and big toes, pecking for food as they go. They have long broad wings with "fingered" wingtips and striking patterns in flight. Many have interesting mating displays.

Australian bustard, Ardeotis australis

Cuckoos
Order: CuculiformesFamily: Cuculidae

The family Cuculidae includes cuckoos, roadrunners and anis. These birds are of variable size with slender bodies, long tails and strong legs. The Old World cuckoos are brood parasites.

Pied coucal, Centropus ateralbus (E)
Greater black coucal, Centropus menbeki
Violaceous coucal, Centropus violaceus (E)
Lesser black coucal, Centropus bernsteini
Pheasant coucal, Centropus phasianinus
Dwarf koel, Microdynamis parva
Asian koel, Eudynamys scolopaceus
Pacific koel, Eudynamys orientalis
Long-tailed koel, Urodynamis taitensis
Channel-billed cuckoo, Scythrops novaehollandiae
Long-billed cuckoo, Chrysococcyx megarhynchus
Horsfield's bronze-cuckoo, Chrysococcyx basalis
Black-eared cuckoo, Chrysococcyx osculans
Rufous-throated bronze-cuckoo, Chrysococcyx ruficollis
Shining bronze-cuckoo, Chrysococcyx lucidus
White-eared bronze-cuckoo, Chrysococcyx meyerii
Little bronze-cuckoo, Chrysococcyx minutillus
Pallid cuckoo, Cuculus pallidus
White-crowned koel, Caliechthrus leucolophus
Chestnut-breasted cuckoo, Cacomantis castaneiventris
Fan-tailed cuckoo, Cacomantis flabelliformis
Brush cuckoo, Cacomantis variolosus
Himalayan cuckoo, Cuculus saturatus
Oriental cuckoo, Cuculus optatus

Frogmouths
Order: CaprimulgiformesFamily: Podargidae

The frogmouths are a group of nocturnal birds related to the nightjars. They are named for their large flattened hooked bill and huge frog-like gape, which they use to take insects.

Marbled frogmouth, Podargus ocellatus
Papuan frogmouth, Podargus papuensis
Solomons frogmouth, Rigidipenna inexpectata

Nightjars and allies
Order: CaprimulgiformesFamily: Caprimulgidae

Nightjars are medium-sized nocturnal birds that usually nest on the ground. They have long wings, short legs and very short bills. Most have small feet, of little use for walking, and long pointed wings. Their soft plumage is camouflaged to resemble bark or leaves.

Solomons nightjar, Eurostopodus nigripennis (E)
White-throated nightjar, Eurostopodus mystacalis
Papuan nightjar, Eurostopodus papuensis
Archbold's nightjar, Eurostopodus archboldi
Gray nightjar, Caprimulgus jotaka (A)
Large-tailed nightjar, Caprimulgus macrurus

Owlet-nightjars
Order: CaprimulgiformesFamily: Aegothelidae

The owlet-nightjars are small nocturnal birds related to the nightjars and frogmouths. They are insectivores which hunt mostly in the air. Their soft plumage is a mixture of browns and paler shades.

Feline owlet-nightjar, Aegotheles insignis
Starry owlet-nightjar, Aegotheles tatei (E)
Wallace's owlet-nightjar, Aegotheles wallacii
Mountain owlet-nightjar, Aegotheles albertisi
Australian owlet-nightjar, Aegotheles cristatus
Barred owlet-nightjar, Aegotheles bennettii

Swifts

Order: CaprimulgiformesFamily: Apodidae

Swifts are small birds which spend the majority of their lives flying. These birds have very short legs and never settle voluntarily on the ground, perching instead only on vertical surfaces. Many swifts have long swept-back wings which resemble a crescent or boomerang.

Papuan spinetailed swift, Mearnsia novaeguineae
White-throated needletail, Hirundapus caudacutus
Glossy swiftlet, Collocalia esculenta
Satin swiftlet, Collocalia uropygialis
Mountain swiftlet, Aerodramus hirundinaceus
White-rumped swiftlet, Aerodramus spodiopygius
Australian swiftlet, Aerodramus terraereginae
Bare-legged swiftlet, Aerodramus nuditarsus
Mayr's swiftlet, Aerodramus orientalis
Uniform swiftlet, Aerodramus vanikorensis
Three-toed swiftlet, Aerodramus papuensis
Pacific swift, Apus pacificus

Treeswifts

Order: CaprimulgiformesFamily: Hemiprocnidae

The treeswifts, also called crested swifts, are closely related to the true swifts. They differ from the other swifts in that they have crests, long forked tails and softer plumage.

Moustached treeswift, Hemiprocne mystacea

Rails, gallinules, and coots
Order: GruiformesFamily: Rallidae

Rallidae is a large family of small to medium-sized birds which includes the rails, crakes, coots and gallinules. Typically they inhabit dense vegetation in damp environments near lakes, swamps or rivers. In general they are shy and secretive birds, making them difficult to observe. Most species have strong legs and long toes which are well adapted to soft uneven surfaces. They tend to have short, rounded wings and to be weak fliers.

Lewin's rail, Lewinia pectoralis
Bare-eyed rail, Gymnocrex plumbeiventris
Chestnut rail, Gallirallus castaneoventris
Buff-banded rail, Gallirallus philippensis
New Britain rail, Gallirallus insignis (E)
Woodford's rail, Gallirallus woodfordi
Barred rail, Gallirallus torquatus
Eurasian moorhen, Gallinula chloropus
Dusky moorhen, Gallinula tenebrosa
Eurasian coot, Fulica atra
Black-backed swamphen, Porphyrio indicus
Australasian swamphen, Porphyrio melanotus
New Guinea flightless rail, Megacrex inepta
Pale-vented bush-hen, Amaurornis moluccana
White-browed crake, Poliolimnas cinereus
Chestnut forest-rail, Rallina rubra
White-striped forest-rail, Rallina leucospila
Forbes's rail, Rallina forbesi
Mayr's rail, Rallina mayri
Red-necked crake, Rallina tricolor
Baillon's crake, Zapornia pusilla
Spotless crake, Zapornia tabuensis

Cranes
Order: GruiformesFamily: Gruidae

Cranes are large, long-legged and long-necked birds. Unlike the similar-looking but unrelated herons, cranes fly with necks outstretched, not pulled back. Most have elaborate and noisy courting displays or "dances".

Brolga, Antigone rubicunda

Thick-knees
Order: CharadriiformesFamily: Burhinidae

The thick-knees are a group of largely tropical waders in the family Burhinidae. They are found worldwide within the tropical zone, with some species also breeding in temperate Europe and Australia. They are medium to large waders with strong black or yellow-black bills, large yellow eyes and cryptic plumage. Despite being classed as waders, most species have a preference for arid or semi-arid habitats.

Bush thick-knee, Burhinus grallarius
Beach thick-knee, Esacus magnirostris

Stilts and avocets
Order: CharadriiformesFamily: Recurvirostridae

Recurvirostridae is a family of large wading birds, which includes the avocets and stilts. The avocets have long legs and long up-curved bills. The stilts have extremely long legs and long, thin straight bills.

Pied stilt, Himantopus leucocephalus
Black-necked stilt, Himantopus mexicanus
Red-necked avocet, Recurvirostra novaehollandiae (A)

Oystercatchers
Order: CharadriiformesFamily: Haematopodidae

The oystercatchers are large and noisy plover-like birds, with strong bills used for smashing or prising open molluscs.

Pied oystercatcher, Haematopus longirostris

Plovers and lapwings
Order: CharadriiformesFamily: Charadriidae

The family Charadriidae includes the plovers, dotterels and lapwings. They are small to medium-sized birds with compact bodies, short, thick necks and long, usually pointed, wings. They are found in open country worldwide, mostly in habitats near water.

Black-bellied plover, Pluvialis squatarola
American golden-plover, Pluvialis dominica
Pacific golden-plover, Pluvialis fulva
Masked lapwing, Vanellus miles
Lesser sand-plover, Charadrius mongolus
Greater sand-plover, Charadrius leschenaultii
Red-capped plover, Charadrius ruficapillus (A)
Common ringed plover, Charadrius hiaticula
Little ringed plover, Charadrius dubius
Oriental plover, Charadrius veredus
Red-kneed dotterel, Erythrogonys cinctus
Black-fronted dotterel, Elseyornis melanops (A)

Jacanas
Order: CharadriiformesFamily: Jacanidae

The Jacanas are a group of tropical waders in the family Jacanidae. They are found throughout the tropics. They are identifiable by their huge feet and claws which enable them to walk on floating vegetation in the shallow lakes that are their preferred habitat.

Comb-crested jacana, Irediparra gallinacea

Sandpipers and allies
Order: CharadriiformesFamily: Scolopacidae

Scolopacidae is a large diverse family of small to medium-sized shorebirds including the sandpipers, curlews, godwits, shanks, tattlers, woodcocks, snipes, dowitchers and phalaropes. The majority of these species eat small invertebrates picked out of the mud or soil. Variation in length of legs and bills enables multiple species to feed in the same habitat, particularly on the coast, without direct competition for food.

Bristle-thighed curlew, Numenius tahitiensis (A)
Whimbrel, Numenius phaeopus
Little curlew, Numenius minutus
Far Eastern curlew, Numenius madagascariensis
Bar-tailed godwit, Limosa lapponica
Black-tailed godwit, Limosa limosa
Ruddy turnstone, Arenaria interpres
Great knot, Calidris tenuirostris
Red knot, Calidris canutus
Ruff, Calidris pugnax
Broad-billed sandpiper, Calidris falcinellus
Sharp-tailed sandpiper, Calidris acuminata
Curlew sandpiper, Calidris ferruginea
Long-toed stint, Calidris subminuta
Red-necked stint, Calidris ruficollis
Sanderling, Calidris alba
Baird's sandpiper, Calidris bairdii (A)
Little stint, Calidris minuta (A)
Buff-breasted sandpiper, Calidris subruficollis
Pectoral sandpiper, Calidris melanotos
Asian dowitcher, Limnodromus semipalmatus
Short-billed dowitcher, Limnodromus griseus (A)
Long-billed dowitcher, Limnodromus scolopaceus (A)
New Guinea woodcock, Scolopax rosenbergii
Latham's snipe, Gallinago hardwickii
Pin-tailed snipe, Gallinago stenura (A)
Swinhoe's snipe, Gallinago megala
Terek sandpiper, Xenus cinereus
Red-necked phalarope, Phalaropus lobatus
Common sandpiper, Actitis hypoleucos
Green sandpiper, Tringa ochropus
Gray-tailed tattler, Tringa brevipes
Wandering tattler, Tringa incana
Common greenshank, Tringa nebularia
Marsh sandpiper, Tringa stagnatilis
Wood sandpiper, Tringa glareola
Common redshank, Tringa totanus

Buttonquail
Order: CharadriiformesFamily: Turnicidae

The buttonquail are small, drab, running birds which resemble the true quails. The female is the brighter of the sexes and initiates courtship. The male incubates the eggs and tends the young.

Red-backed buttonquail, Turnix maculosa
Red-chested buttonquail, Turnix pyrrhothorax

Pratincoles and coursers
Order: CharadriiformesFamily: Glareolidae

Glareolidae is a family of wading birds comprising the pratincoles, which have short legs, long pointed wings and long forked tails, and the coursers, which have long legs, short wings and long, pointed bills which curve downwards.

Australian pratincole, Stiltia isabella
Oriental pratincole, Glareola maldivarum

Skuas and jaegers
Order: CharadriiformesFamily: Stercorariidae

The family Stercorariidae are, in general, medium to large birds, typically with grey or brown plumage, often with white markings on the wings. They nest on the ground in temperate and arctic regions and are long-distance migrants.

South Polar skua, Stercorarius maccormicki (A)
Pomarine jaeger, Stercorarius pomarinus
Parasitic jaeger, Stercorarius parasiticus
Long-tailed jaeger, Stercorarius longicaudus

Gulls, terns, and skimmers
Order: CharadriiformesFamily: Laridae

Laridae is a family of medium to large seabirds, the gulls, terns, and skimmers. Gulls are typically grey or white, often with black markings on the head or wings. They have stout, longish bills and webbed feet. Terns are a group of generally medium to large seabirds typically with grey or white plumage, often with black markings on the head. Most terns hunt fish by diving but some pick insects off the surface of fresh water. Terns are generally long-lived birds, with several species known to live in excess of 30 years.

Silver gull, Chroicocephalus novaehollandiae
Black-headed gull, Chroicocephalus ridibundus
Black-tailed gull, Larus crassirostris
Brown noddy, Anous stolidus
Black noddy, Anous minutus
Lesser noddy, Anous tenuirostris (A)
White tern, Gygis alba
Sooty tern, Onychoprion fuscatus
Gray-backed tern, Onychoprion lunatus (A)
Bridled tern, Onychoprion anaethetus
Little tern, Sternula albifrons
Gull-billed tern, Gelochelidon nilotica
Caspian tern, Hydroprogne caspia
White-winged tern, Chlidonias leucopterus
Whiskered tern, Chlidonias hybrida
Roseate tern, Sterna dougallii
Black-naped tern, Sterna sumatrana
Common tern, Sterna hirundo
Great crested tern, Thalasseus bergii
Lesser crested tern, Thalasseus bengalensis

Tropicbirds
Order: PhaethontiformesFamily: Phaethontidae

Tropicbirds are slender white birds of tropical oceans, with exceptionally long central tail feathers. Their heads and long wings have black markings.

White-tailed tropicbird, Phaethon lepturus
Red-tailed tropicbird, Phaethon rubricauda

Albatrosses
Order: ProcellariiformesFamily: Diomedeidae

The albatrosses are a family of large seabird found across the Southern and North Pacific Oceans. The largest are among the largest flying birds in the world.

Laysan albatross, Phoebastria immutabilis (A)

Southern storm-petrels
Order: ProcellariiformesFamily: Oceanitidae

The southern storm-petrels are relatives of the petrels and are the smallest seabirds. They feed on planktonic crustaceans and small fish picked from the surface, typically while hovering. The flight is fluttering and sometimes bat-like.

Wilson's storm-petrel, Oceanites oceanicus
White-faced storm-petrel, Pelagodroma marina (A)
White-bellied storm-petrel, Fregetta grallaria
Black-bellied storm-petrel, Fregetta tropica

Northern storm-petrels
Order: ProcellariiformesFamily: Hydrobatidae

Though the members of this family are similar in many respects to the southern storm-petrels, including their general appearance and habits, there are enough genetic differences to warrant their placement in a separate family.

Leach's storm-petrel, Hydrobates leucorhous
Band-rumped storm-petrel, Hydrobates castro (A)
Matsudaira's storm-petrel, Hydrobates matsudairae

Shearwaters and petrels
Order: ProcellariiformesFamily: Procellariidae

The procellariids are the main group of medium-sized "true petrels", characterised by united nostrils with medium septum and a long outer functional primary.

Southern giant petrel, Macronectes giganteus
Kermadec petrel, Pterodroma neglecta
Herald petrel, Pterodroma heraldica (A)
Providence petrel, Pterodroma solandri (A)
Gould's petrel, Pterodroma leucoptera
Collared petrel, Pterodroma brevipes
Fairy prion, Pachyptila turtur
Bulwer's petrel, Bulweria bulwerii (A)
Tahiti petrel, Pseudobulweria rostrata
Beck's petrel, Pseudobulweria becki
Streaked shearwater, Calonectris leucomelas
Flesh-footed shearwater, Ardenna carneipes
Wedge-tailed shearwater, Ardenna pacificus
Sooty shearwater, Ardenna griseus
Short-tailed shearwater, Ardenna tenuirostris
Christmas shearwater, Puffinus nativitatis
Tropical shearwater, Puffinus bailloni
Heinroth's shearwater, Puffinus heinrothi

Storks
Order: CiconiiformesFamily: Ciconiidae

Storks are large, long-legged, long-necked, wading birds with long, stout bills. Storks are mute, but bill-clattering is an important mode of communication at the nest. Their nests can be large and may be reused for many years. Many species are migratory.

Black-necked stork, Ephippiorhynchus asiaticus

Frigatebirds
Order: SuliformesFamily: Fregatidae

Frigatebirds are large seabirds usually found over tropical oceans. They are large, black-and-white or completely black, with long wings and deeply forked tails. The males have coloured inflatable throat pouches. They do not swim or walk and cannot take off from a flat surface. Having the largest wingspan-to-body-weight ratio of any bird, they are essentially aerial, able to stay aloft for more than a week.

Lesser frigatebird, Fregata ariel
Great frigatebird, Fregata minor

Boobies and gannets
Order: SuliformesFamily: Sulidae

The sulids comprise the gannets and boobies. Both groups are medium to large coastal seabirds that plunge-dive for fish.

Masked booby, Sula dactylatra
Brown booby, Sula leucogaster
Red-footed booby, Sula sula
Abbott's booby, Papasula abbotti (A)

Anhingas
Order: SuliformesFamily: Anhingidae

Anhingas or darters are often called "snake-birds" because of their long thin necks, which gives a snake-like appearance when they swim with their bodies submerged. The males have black and dark-brown plumage, an erectile crest on the nape and a larger bill than the female. The females have much paler plumage especially on the neck and underparts. The darters have completely webbed feet and their legs are short and set far back on the body. Their plumage is somewhat permeable, like that of cormorants, and they spread their wings to dry after diving.

Oriental darter, Anhinga melanogaster
Australasian darter, Anhinga novaehollandiae

Cormorants and shags
Order: SuliformesFamily: Phalacrocoracidae

Phalacrocoracidae is a family of medium to large coastal, fish-eating seabirds that includes cormorants and shags. Plumage colouration varies, with the majority having mainly dark plumage, some species being black-and-white and a few being colourful.

Little pied cormorant, Microcarbo melanoleucos
Great cormorant, Phalacrocorax carbo
Little black cormorant, Phalacrocorax sulcirostris
Pied cormorant, Phalacrocorax varius

Pelicans
Order: PelecaniformesFamily: Pelecanidae

Pelicans are large water birds with a distinctive pouch under their beak. As with other members of the order Pelecaniformes, they have webbed feet with four toes.

Australian pelican, Pelecanus conspicillatus

Herons, egrets, and bitterns
Order: PelecaniformesFamily: Ardeidae

The family Ardeidae contains the bitterns, herons and egrets. Herons and egrets are medium to large wading birds with long necks and legs. Bitterns tend to be shorter necked and more wary. Members of Ardeidae fly with their necks retracted, unlike other long-necked birds such as storks, ibises and spoonbills.

Yellow bittern, Ixobrychus sinensis
Black-backed bittern, Ixobrychus dubius
Black bittern, Ixobrychus flavicollis
Forest bittern, Zonerodius heliosylus
Pacific heron, Ardea pacifica
Great-billed heron, Ardea sumatrana
Great egret, Ardea alba
Intermediate egret, Ardea intermedia
White-faced heron, Egretta novaehollandiae
Little egret, Egretta garzetta
Pacific reef-heron, Egretta sacra
Pied heron, Egretta picata
Cattle egret, Bubulcus ibis
Striated heron, Butorides striata
Nankeen night-heron, Nycticorax caledonicus

Ibises and spoonbills
Order: PelecaniformesFamily: Threskiornithidae

Threskiornithidae is a family of large terrestrial and wading birds which includes the ibises and spoonbills. They have long, broad wings with 11 primary and about 20 secondary feathers. They are strong fliers and despite their size and weight, very capable soarers.

Glossy ibis, Plegadis falcinellus
African sacred ibis, Threskiornis aethiopicus
Australian ibis, Threskiornis moluccus
Straw-necked ibis, Threskiornis spinicollis
Royal spoonbill, Platalea regia
Yellow-billed spoonbill, Platalea flavipes

Osprey
Order: AccipitriformesFamily: Pandionidae

The family Pandionidae contains only one species, the osprey. The osprey is a medium-large raptor which is a specialist fish-eater with a worldwide distribution.

Osprey, Pandion haliaetus

Hawks, eagles, and kites

Order: AccipitriformesFamily: Accipitridae

Accipitridae is a family of birds of prey, which includes hawks, eagles, kites, harriers and Old World vultures. These birds have powerful hooked beaks for tearing flesh from their prey, strong legs, powerful talons and keen eyesight.

Black-winged kite, Elanus caeruleus
Long-tailed honey-buzzard, Henicopernis longicauda
Black honey-buzzard, Henicopernis infuscatus (E)
Pacific baza, Aviceda subcristata
Bat hawk, Macheiramphus alcinus
Papuan eagle, Harpyopsis novaeguineae
Pygmy eagle, Hieraaetus weiskei
Gurney's eagle, Aquila gurneyi
Wedge-tailed eagle, Aquila audax
Papuan marsh-harrier, Circus spilothorax (E)
Swamp harrier, Circus approximans
Pied harrier, Circus melanoleucos
Chinese sparrowhawk, Accipiter soloensis
Variable goshawk, Accipiter hiogaster
Gray goshawk, Accipiter novaehollandiae
Brown goshawk, Accipiter fasciatus
Black-mantled goshawk, Accipiter melanochlamys
Pied goshawk, Accipiter albogularis
Slaty-mantled goshawk, Accipiter luteoschistaceus (E)
Imitator sparrowhawk, Accipiter imitator (E)
Gray-headed goshawk, Accipiter poliocephalus
New Britain goshawk, Accipiter princeps (E)
Collared sparrowhawk, Accipiter cirrocephalus
New Britain sparrowhawk, Accipiter brachyurus (E)
Meyer's goshawk, Accipiter meyerianus
Chestnut-shouldered goshawk, Erythrotriorchis buergersi
Doria's goshawk, Megatriorchis doriae
Black kite, Milvus migrans
Whistling kite, Haliastur sphenurus
Brahminy kite, Haliastur indus
White-bellied sea-eagle, Haliaeetus leucogaster
Sanford's sea-eagle, Haliaeetus sanfordi

Barn-owls
Order: StrigiformesFamily: Tytonidae

Barn-owls are medium to large owls with large heads and characteristic heart-shaped faces. They have long strong legs with powerful talons.

Sooty owl, Tyto tenebricosa
Australian masked-owl, Tyto novaehollandiae
Golden masked-owl, Tyto aurantia (E)
Manus masked-owl, Tyto manusi (E)
Australasian grass-owl, Tyto longimembris
Barn owl, Tyto alba

Owls
Order: StrigiformesFamily: Strigidae

The typical owls are small to large solitary nocturnal birds of prey. They have large forward-facing eyes and ears, a hawk-like beak and a conspicuous circle of feathers around each eye called a facial disk.

Fearful owl, Nesasio solomonensis
Rufous owl, Ninox rufa
Barking owl, Ninox connivens
Southern boobook, Ninox boobook
Morepork, Ninox novaeseelandiae
Papuan boobook, Ninox theomacha
Manus boobook, Ninox meeki (E)
Bismarck boobook, Ninox variegata (E)
New Britain boobook, Ninox odiosa (E)
Solomons boobook, Ninox jacquinoti
Papuan owl, Uroglaux dimorpha

Hornbills
Order: BucerotiformesFamily: Bucerotidae

Hornbills are a group of birds whose bill is shaped like a cow's horn, but without a twist, sometimes with a casque on the upper mandible. Frequently, the bill is brightly coloured.

Blyth's hornbill, Rhyticeros plicatus

Kingfishers
Order: CoraciiformesFamily: Alcedinidae

Kingfishers are medium-sized birds with large heads, long pointed bills, short legs, and stubby tails.

Common kingfisher, Alcedo atthis
Azure kingfisher, Ceyx azureus
Bismarck kingfisher, Ceyx websteri (E)
Little kingfisher, Ceyx pusillus
Papuan dwarf-kingfisher, Ceyx solitarius
Manus dwarf-kingfisher, Ceyx dispar (E)
New Ireland dwarf-kingfisher, Ceyx mulcatus (E)
New Britain dwarf-kingfisher, Ceyx sacerdotis (E)
North Solomons dwarf-kingfisher, Ceyx meeki 
Blue-winged kookaburra, Dacelo leachii
Spangled kookaburra, Dacelo tyro
Rufous-bellied kookaburra, Dacelo gaudichaud
Shovel-billed kookaburra, Clytoceyx rex
Blue-black kingfisher, Todirhamphus nigrocyaneus
Forest kingfisher, Todirhamphus macleayii
New Britain kingfisher, Todirhamphus albonotatus (E)
Ultramarine kingfisher, Todirhamphus leucopygius
Pohnpei kingfisher, Todirhamphus reichenbachii (A)
Colonist kingfisher, Todirhamphus colonus
Torresian kingfisher, Todirhamphus sordidus
Sacred kingfisher, Todirhamphus sanctus
Collared kingfisher, Todirhamphus chloris
Beach kingfisher, Todirhamphus saurophaga
Melanesian kingfisher, Todirhamphus tristrami
Hook-billed kingfisher, Melidora macrorrhina
Moustached kingfisher, Actenoides bougainvillei
Yellow-billed kingfisher, Syma torotoro
Mountain kingfisher, Syma megarhyncha
Little paradise-kingfisher, Tanysiptera hydrocharis
Common paradise-kingfisher, Tanysiptera galatea
Red-breasted paradise-kingfisher, Tanysiptera nympha
Brown-headed paradise-kingfisher, Tanysiptera danae (E)
Buff-breasted paradise-kingfisher, Tanysiptera sylvia
Black-capped paradise-kingfisher, Tanysiptera nigriceps

Bee-eaters
Order: CoraciiformesFamily: Meropidae

The bee-eaters are a group of near passerine birds in the family Meropidae. Most species are found in Africa but others occur in southern Europe, Madagascar, Australia and New Guinea. They are characterised by richly coloured plumage, slender bodies and usually elongated central tail feathers. All are colourful and have long downturned bills and pointed wings, which give them a swallow-like appearance when seen from afar.

Blue-tailed bee-eater, Merops philippinus
Rainbow bee-eater, Merops ornatus

Rollers
Order: CoraciiformesFamily: Coraciidae

Rollers resemble crows in size and build, but are more closely related to the kingfishers and bee-eaters. They share the colourful appearance of those groups with blues and browns predominating. The two inner front toes are connected, but the outer toe is not.

Dollarbird, Eurystomus orientalis

Falcons and caracaras
Order: FalconiformesFamily: Falconidae

Falconidae is a family of diurnal birds of prey. They differ from hawks, eagles and kites in that they kill with their beaks instead of their talons.

Collared falconet, Microhierax caerulescens (A)
Spotted kestrel, Falco moluccensis (A)
Nankeen kestrel, Falco cenchroides
Oriental hobby, Falco severus
Australian hobby, Falco longipennis
Brown falcon, Falco berigora
Gray falcon, Falco hypoleucos (A)
Peregrine falcon, Falco peregrinus

Cockatoos
Order: PsittaciformesFamily: Cacatuidae

The cockatoos share many features with other parrots including the characteristic curved beak shape and a zygodactyl foot, with two forward toes and two backwards toes. They differ, however in a number of characteristics, including the often spectacular movable headcrest.

Palm cockatoo, Probosciger aterrimus
Little corella, Cacatua sanguinea
Ducorps's cockatoo, Cacatua ducorpsii
Sulphur-crested cockatoo, Cacatua galerita
Blue-eyed cockatoo, Cacatua ophthalmica (E)

Old World parrots
Order: PsittaciformesFamily: Psittaculidae

Characteristic features of parrots include a strong curved bill, an upright stance, strong legs, and clawed zygodactyl feet. Many parrots are vividly coloured, and some are multi-coloured. Old World parrots are found from Africa east across south and southeast Asia and Oceania to Australia and New Zealand.

Pesquet's parrot, Psittrichas fulgidus
Yellow-capped pygmy-parrot, Micropsitta keiensis
Buff-faced pygmy-parrot, Micropsitta pusio
Red-breasted pygmy-parrot, Micropsitta bruijnii
Meek's pygmy-parrot, Micropsitta meeki (E)
Finsch's pygmy-parrot, Micropsitta finschii
Papuan king-parrot, Alisterus chloropterus
Red-winged parrot, Aprosmictus erythropterus
Eclectus parrot, Eclectus roratus
Red-cheeked parrot, Geoffroyus geoffroyi
Blue-collared parrot, Geoffroyus simplex
Singing parrot, Geoffroyus heteroclitus
Painted tiger-parrot, Psittacella picta
Brehm's tiger-parrot, Psittacella brehmii
Modest tiger-parrot, Psittacella modesta
Madarasz's tiger-parrot, Psittacella madaraszi
Yellow-billed lorikeet, Neopsittacus musschenbroekii
Orange-billed lorikeet, Neopsittacus pullicauda
Orange-breasted fig-parrot, Cyclopsitta gulielmitertii
Double-eyed fig-parrot, Cyclopsitta diophthalma
Large fig-parrot, Psittaculirostris desmarestii
Edwards's fig-parrot, Psittaculirostris edwardsii
Plum-faced lorikeet, Oreopsittacus arfaki
Pygmy lorikeet, Charminetta wilhelminae
Red-fronted lorikeet, Hypocharmosyna rubronotata
Red-flanked lorikeet, Hypocharmosyna placentis
Fairy lorikeet, Charmosynopsis pulchella
Striated lorikeet, Synorhacma multistriata
Duchess lorikeet, Charmosynoides margarethae
Red-chinned lorikeet, Vini rubrigularis (E)
Meek's lorikeet, Vini meeki 
Josephine's lorikeet, Charmosyna josefinae
Papuan lorikeet, Charmosyna papou
Brown lory, Chalcopsitta duivenbodei
Yellowish-streaked lory, Chalcopsitta scintillata
Purple-bellied lory, Lorius hypoinochrous (E)
Black-capped lory, Lorius lory
White-naped lory, Lorius albidinuchus (E)
Goldie's lorikeet, Glossoptila goldiei
Dusky lory, Pseudeos fuscata
Cardinal lory, Pseudeos cardinalis
Coconut lorikeet, Trichoglossus haematodus
Rainbow lorikeet, Trichoglossus moluccanus
Papuan hanging-parrot, Loriculus aurantiifrons
Green-fronted hanging-parrot, Loriculus tener (E)

Pittas

Order: PasseriformesFamily: Pittidae

Pittas are medium-sized by passerine standards and are stocky, with fairly long, strong legs, short tails and stout bills. Many are brightly coloured. They spend the majority of their time on wet forest floors, eating snails, insects and similar invertebrates.

Papuan pitta, Erythropitta macklotii
New Ireland pitta, Erythropitta novaehibernicae 
Tabar pitta, Erythropitta splendida (E)
New Britain pitta, Erythropitta gazellae (E)
Louisiade pitta, Erythropitta meeki (E)
Hooded pitta, Pitta sordida
Noisy pitta, Pitta versicolor
Black-faced pitta, Pitta anerythra
Superb pitta, Pitta superba (E)

Bowerbirds
Order: PasseriformesFamily: Ptilonorhynchidae

The bowerbirds are small to medium-sized passerine birds. The males notably build a bower to attract a mate. Depending on the species, the bower ranges from a circle of cleared earth with a small pile of twigs in the center to a complex and highly decorated structure of sticks and leaves.

White-eared catbird, Ailuroedus buccoides
Ochre-breasted catbird, Ailuroedus stonii
Tan-capped catbird, Ailuroedus geislerorum
Huon catbird, Ailuroedus astigmaticus
Black-capped catbird, Ailuroedus melanocephalus
Northern catbird, Ailuroedus jobiensis
Black-eared catbird, Ailuroedus melanotis
Archbold's bowerbird, Archboldia papuensis
MacGregor's bowerbird, Amblyornis macgregoriae
Streaked bowerbird, Amblyornis subalaris (E)
Masked bowerbird, Sericulus aureus
Flame bowerbird, Sericulus ardens
Fire-maned bowerbird, Sericulus bakeri (E)
Yellow-breasted bowerbird, Chlamydera lauterbachi
Fawn-breasted bowerbird, Chlamydera cerviniventris

Australasian treecreepers
Order: PasseriformesFamily: Climacteridae

The Climacteridae are medium-small, mostly brown-coloured birds with patterning on their underparts. They are endemic to Australia and New Guinea.

Papuan treecreeper, Cormobates placens

Fairywrens
Order: PasseriformesFamily: Maluridae

Maluridae is a family of small, insectivorous passerine birds endemic to Australia and New Guinea. They are socially monogamous and sexually promiscuous, meaning that although they form pairs between one male and one female, each partner will mate with other individuals and even assist in raising the young from such pairings.

Wallace's fairywren, Sipodotus wallacii
Orange-crowned fairywren, Clytomyias insignis
Broad-billed fairywren, Chenorhamphus grayi
Campbell's fairywren, Chenorhamphus campbelli
Emperor fairywren, Malurus cyanocephalus
White-shouldered fairywren, Malurus alboscapulatus

Honeyeaters

Order: PasseriformesFamily: Meliphagidae

The honeyeaters are a large and diverse family of small to medium-sized birds most common in Australia and New Guinea. They are nectar feeders and closely resemble other nectar-feeding passerines.

Plain honeyeater, Pycnopygius ixoides
Marbled honeyeater, Pycnopygius cinereus
Streak-headed honeyeater, Pycnopygius stictocephalus
Puff-backed honeyeater, Meliphaga aruensis
Yellow-spotted honeyeater, Meliphaga notata
Scrub honeyeater, Microptilotis albonotatus
Mountain honeyeater, Microptilotis orientalis
Mimic honeyeater, Microptilotis analogus
Forest honeyeater, Microptilotis montanus
Mottled honeyeater, Microptilotis mimikae
Yellow-gaped honeyeater, Microptilotis flavirictus
Tagula honeyeater, Microptilotis vicina 
Graceful honeyeater, Microptilotis gracilis
Elegant honeyeater, Microptilotis cinereifrons 
Black-throated honeyeater, Caligavis subfrenata
Obscure honeyeater, Caligavis obscura
Sooty melidectes, Melidectes fuscus
Long-bearded melidectes, Melidectes princeps
Ornate melidectes, Melidectes torquatus
Cinnamon-browed melidectes, Melidectes ochromelas
Huon melidectes, Melidectes foersteri (E)
Belford's melidectes, Melidectes belfordi
Yellow-browed melidectes, Melidectes rufocrissalis
Varied honeyeater, Gavicalis versicolor
Yellow-tinted honeyeater, Ptilotula flavescens
Bougainville honeyeater, Stresemannia bougainvillei (E)
Brown-backed honeyeater, Ramsayornis modestus
Rufous-banded honeyeater, Conopophila albogularis
Smoky honeyeater, Melipotes fumigatus
Spangled honeyeater, Melipotes ater (E)
Macgregor's honeyeater, Macgregoria pulchra
Long-billed honeyeater, Melilestes megarhynchus
Olive straightbill, Timeliopsis fulvigula
Tawny straightbill, Timeliopsis griseigula
Bismarck honeyeater, Vosea whitemanensis (E)
White-chinned myzomela, Myzomela albigula (E)
Ruby-throated myzomela, Myzomela eques
Ashy myzomela, Myzomela cineracea (E)
Dusky myzomela, Myzomela obscura
Red myzomela, Myzomela cruentata
Papuan black myzomela, Myzomela nigrita
New Ireland myzomela, Myzomela pulchella (E)
Red-headed myzomela, Myzomela erythrocephala
Elfin myzomela, Myzomela adolphinae
Sclater's myzomela, Myzomela sclateri (E)
Bismarck black myzomela, Myzomela pammelaena (E)
Scarlet-naped myzomela, Myzomela lafargei
Yellow-vented myzomela, Myzomela eichhorni
Black-bellied myzomela, Myzomela erythromelas (E)
Red-collared myzomela, Myzomela rosenbergii
Green-backed honeyeater, Glycichaera fallax
Leaden honeyeater, Ptiloprora plumbea
Yellow-streaked honeyeater, Ptiloprora meekiana
Rufous-backed honeyeater, Ptiloprora guisei (E)
Gray-streaked honeyeater, Ptiloprora perstriata
Brown honeyeater, Lichmera indistincta
Silver-eared honeyeater, Lichmera alboauricularis
Blue-faced honeyeater, Entomyzon cyanotis
White-throated honeyeater, Melithreptus albogularis
Tawny-breasted honeyeater, Xanthotis flaviventer
Spotted honeyeater, Xanthotis polygramma
Little friarbird, Philemon citreogularis
Meyer's friarbird, Philemon meyeri
New Ireland friarbird, Philemon eichhorni (E)
Helmeted friarbird, Philemon buceroides
White-naped friarbird, Philemon albitorques (E)
New Britain friarbird, Philemon cockerelli (E)
Silver-crowned friarbird, Philemon argenticeps (E)
Noisy friarbird, Philemon corniculatus

Thornbills and allies
Order: PasseriformesFamily: Acanthizidae

Thornbills are small passerine birds, similar in habits to the tits.

Goldenface, Pachycare flavogriseum
Rusty mouse-warbler, Crateroscelis murina
Bicolored mouse-warbler, Crateroscelis nigrorufa
Mountain mouse-warbler, Crateroscelis robusta
Tropical scrubwren, Sericornis beccarii
Large scrubwren, Sericornis nouhuysi
Buff-faced scrubwren, Sericornis perspicillatus
Papuan scrubwren, Sericornis papuensis
Gray-green scrubwren, Sericornis arfakianus
Pale-billed scrubwren, Sericornis spilodera
Papuan thornbill, Acanthiza murina
Gray thornbill, Acanthiza cinerea
Green-backed gerygone, Gerygone chloronotus
Fairy gerygone, Gerygone palpebrosa
White-throated gerygone, Gerygone olivacea
Yellow-bellied gerygone, Gerygone chrysogaster
Large-billed gerygone, Gerygone magnirostris
Golden-bellied gerygone, Gerygone sulphurea
Brown-breasted gerygone, Gerygone ruficollis
Mangrove gerygone, Gerygone levigaster

Pseudo-babblers
Order: PasseriformesFamily: Pomatostomidae

The pseudo-babblers are small to medium-sized birds endemic to Australia and New Guinea. They are ground-feeding omnivores and highly social. 

New Guinea babbler, Pomatostomus isidorei
Gray-crowned babbler, Pomatostomus temporalis

Logrunners
Order: PasseriformesFamily: Orthonychidae

The Orthonychidae is a family of birds with a single genus, Orthonyx, which comprises two types of passerine birds endemic to Australia and New Guinea, the logrunners and the chowchilla. Both use stiffened tails to brace themselves when feeding.

Papuan logrunner, Orthonyx novaeguineae

Quail-thrushes and jewel-babblers
Order: PasseriformesFamily: Cinclosomatidae

The Cinclosomatidae is a family containing jewel-babblers and quail-thrushes.

Painted quail-thrush, Cinclosoma ajax
Spotted jewel-babbler, Ptilorrhoa leucosticta
Blue jewel-babbler, Ptilorrhoa caerulescens
Dimorphic jewel-babbler, Ptilorrhoa geislerorum
Chestnut-backed jewel-babbler, Ptilorrhoa castanonota

Cuckooshrikes
Order: PasseriformesFamily: Campephagidae

The cuckooshrikes are small to medium-sized passerine birds. They are predominantly greyish with white and black, although some species are brightly coloured.

Stout-billed cuckooshrike, Coracina caeruleogrisea
Hooded cuckooshrike, Coracina longicauda
Barred cuckooshrike, Coracina lineata
Boyer's cuckooshrike, Coracina boyeri
Black-faced cuckooshrike, Coracina novaehollandiae
North Melanesian cuckooshrike, Coracina welchmani
White-bellied cuckooshrike, Coracina papuensis
Manus cuckooshrike, Coracina ingens (E)
South Melanesian cuckooshrike, Coracina caledonica
Golden cuckooshrike, Campochaera sloetii
White-winged triller, Lalage tricolor
Black-browed triller, Lalage atrovirens
Varied triller, Lalage leucomela
Mussau triller, Lalage conjuncta (E)
Black-bellied cicadabird, Edolisoma montanum
Manus cicadabird, Edolisoma admiralitatis (E)
Solomons cuckooshrike, Edolisoma holopolium
Papuan cicadabird, Edolisoma incertum
Sulawesi cicadabird, Edolisoma morio
Common cicadabird, Edolisoma tenuirostre
Gray-headed cicadabird, Edolisoma schisticeps
Black cicadabird, Edolisoma melas

Sittellas
Order: PasseriformesFamily: Neosittidae

The sittellas are a family of small passerine birds found only in Australasia. They resemble treecreepers, but have soft tails.

Black sittella, Daphoenositta miranda
Papuan sittella, Daphoenositta papuensis

Whipbirds and wedgebills
Order: PasseriformesFamily: Psophodidae

The Psophodidae is a family containing whipbirds and wedgebills.

Papuan whipbird, Androphobus viridis (E)

Ploughbill
Order: PasseriformesFamily: Eulacestomidae

The wattled ploughbill was long thought to be related to the whistlers (Pachycephalidae), and shriketits (formerly Pachycephalidae, now often treated as its own family).

Wattled ploughbill, Eulacestoma nigropectus

Australo-Papuan bellbirds
Order: PasseriformesFamily: Oreoicidae

The three species contained in the family have been moved around between  different families for fifty years. A series of studies of the DNA of Australian birds between 2006 and 2001 found strong support for treating the three genera as a new family, which was formally named in 2016.

Rufous-naped bellbird, Aleadryas rufinucha
Piping bellbird, Ornorectes cristatus

Tit berrypecker and crested berrypecker

Order: PasseriformesFamily: Paramythiidae

Paramythiidae is a very small bird family restricted to the mountain forests of New Guinea. The two species are colourful medium-sized birds which feed on fruit and some insects.

Tit berrypecker, Oreocharis arfaki
Crested berrypecker, Paramythia montium

Whistlers and allies
Order: PasseriformesFamily: Pachycephalidae

The family Pachycephalidae includes the whistlers, shrikethrushes, and some of the pitohuis.

Rusty pitohui, Pseudorectes ferrugineus
White-bellied pitohui, Pseudorectes incertus
Gray shrikethrush, Colluricincla harmonica
Sooty shrikethrush, Colluricincla tenebrosa
Variable shrikethrush, Colluricincla fortis (E)
Sepik-Ramu shrikethrush, Colluricincla tappenbecki (E)
Arafura shrikethrush, Colluricincla megarhyncha
Tagula shrikethrush, Colluricincla discolor (E)
Rufous shrikethrush, Colluricincla rufogaster
Black pitohui, Melanorectes nigrescens
Regent whistler, Pachycephala schlegelii
Sclater's whistler, Pachycephala soror
Bougainville hooded whistler, Pachycephala richardsi (E)
Bismarck whistler, Pachycephala citreogaster 
Louisiade whistler, Pachycephala collaris
Oriole whistler, Pachycephala orioloides
Baliem whistler, Pachycephala balim (E)
Black-tailed whistler, Pachycephala melanura
Brown-backed whistler, Pachycephala modesta (E)
Lorentz's whistler, Pachycephala lorentzi
Golden-backed whistler, Pachycephala aurea
Island whistler, Pachycephala phaionota (E)
Biak whistler, Pachycephala melanorhyncha
Rusty whistler, Pachycephala hyperythra
Gray whistler, Pachycephala simplex
White-bellied whistler, Pachycephala leucogastra
Black-headed whistler, Pachycephala monacha
Rufous whistler, Pachycephala rufiventris
White-breasted whistler, Pachycephala lanioides

Old World orioles

Order: PasseriformesFamily: Oriolidae

The Old World orioles are colourful passerine birds. They are not related to the New World orioles.

Hooded pitohui, Pitohui dichrous
Northern variable pitohui, Pitohui kirhocephalus
Southern variable pitohui, Pitohui uropygialis
Brown oriole, Oriolus szalayi
Olive-backed oriole, Oriolus sagittatus
Green oriole, Oriolus flavocinctus
Australasian figbird, Sphecotheres vieilloti

Boatbills
Order: PasseriformesFamily: Machaerirhynchidae

The boatbills have affinities to woodswallows and butcherbirds, and are distributed across New Guinea and northern Queensland.

Black-breasted boatbill, Machaerirhynchus nigripectus
Yellow-breasted boatbill, Machaerirhynchus flaviventer

Woodswallows, bellmagpies, and allies 

Order: PasseriformesFamily: Artamidae

The woodswallows are soft-plumaged, somber-coloured passerine birds. They are smooth, agile flyers with moderately large, semi-triangular wings. The cracticids: currawongs, bellmagpies and butcherbirds, are similar to the other corvids. They have large, straight bills and mostly black, white or grey plumage. All are omnivorous to some degree.

Great woodswallow, Artamus maximus
White-breasted woodswallow, Artamus leucorynchus
Bismarck woodswallow, Artamus insignis (E)
Black-faced woodswallow, Artamus cinereus
Mountain peltops, Peltops montanus
Lowland peltops, Peltops blainvillii
Black-backed butcherbird, Cracticus mentalis
Hooded butcherbird, Cracticus cassicus
Tagula butcherbird, Cracticus louisiadensis (E)
Black butcherbird, Melloria quoyi
Australian magpie, Gymnorhina tibicen

Mottled berryhunter
Order: PasseriformesFamily: Rhagologidae

The mottled berryhunter or mottled whistler (Rhagologus leucostigma) is a species of bird whose relationships are unclear but most likely related to the woodswallows, boatbills and butcherbirds.

Mottled berryhunter, Rhagologus leucostigma

Fantails
Order: PasseriformesFamily: Rhipiduridae

The fantails are small insectivorous birds which are specialist aerial feeders.

Drongo fantail, Chaetorhynchus papuensis
Black fantail, Rhipidura atra
Cockerell's fantail, Rhipidura cockerelli
Northern fantail, Rhipidura rufiventris
Sooty thicket-fantail, Rhipidura threnothorax
Black thicket-fantail, Rhipidura maculipectus
White-bellied thicket-fantail, Rhipidura leucothorax
Willie-wagtail, Rhipidura leucophrys
Rufous-backed fantail, Rhipidura rufidorsa
Dimorphic fantail, Rhipidura brachyrhyncha
Bismarck fantail, Rhipidura dahli (E)
Mussau fantail, Rhipidura matthiae (E)
Manus fantail, Rhipidura semirubra (E)
Rufous fantail, Rhipidura rufifrons
Arafura fantail, Rhipidura dryas
Friendly fantail, Rhipidura albolimbata
Chestnut-bellied fantail, Rhipidura hyperythra
Brown fantail, Rhipidura drownei
Gray fantail, Rhipidura albiscapa
Mangrove fantail, Rhipidura phasiana

Drongos
Order: PasseriformesFamily: Dicruridae

The drongos are mostly black or dark grey in colour, sometimes with metallic tints. They have long forked tails, and some Asian species have elaborate tail decorations. They have short legs and sit very upright when perched, like a shrike. They flycatch or take prey from the ground.

Hair-crested drongo, Dicrurus hottentottus
Ribbon-tailed drongo, Dicrurus megarhynchus (E)
Spangled drongo, Dicrurus bracteatus

Birds-of-paradise
Order: PasseriformesFamily: Paradisaeidae

The birds-of-paradise are best known for the striking plumage possessed by the males of most species, in particular highly elongated and elaborate feathers extending from the tail, wings or head. These plumes are used in courtship displays to attract females.

Trumpet manucode, Phonygammus keraudrenii
Curl-crested manucode, Manucodia comrii (E)
Crinkle-collared manucode, Manucodia chalybata
Jobi manucode, Manucodia jobiensis
Glossy-mantled manucode, Manucodia atra
King-of-Saxony bird-of-paradise, Pteridophora alberti
Carola's parotia, Parotia carolae
Wahnes's parotia, Parotia wahnesi (E)
Lawes's parotia, Parotia lawesii (E)
Twelve-wired bird-of-paradise, Seleucidis melanoleuca
Black-billed sicklebill, Drepanornis albertisi
Pale-billed sicklebill, Drepanornis bruijnii
Greater lophorina, Lophorina superba
Lesser lophorina, Lophorina minor (E)
Magnificent riflebird, Ptiloris magnificus
Growling riflebird, Ptiloris intercedens
Black sicklebill, Epimachus fastuosus
Brown sicklebill, Epimachus meyeri
Short-tailed paradigalla, Paradigalla brevicauda
Splendid astrapia, Astrapia splendidissima
Huon astrapia, Astrapia rothschildi (E)
Stephanie's astrapia, Astrapia stephaniae (E)
Ribbon-tailed astrapia, Astrapia mayeri (E)
King bird-of-paradise, Cicinnurus regius
Magnificent bird-of-paradise, Cicinnurus magnificus
Blue bird-of-paradise, Paradisaea rudolphi (E)
Emperor bird-of-paradise, Paradisaea guilielmi (E)
Goldie's bird-of-paradise, Paradisaea decora (E)
Lesser bird-of-paradise, Paradisaea minor
Raggiana bird-of-paradise, Paradisaea raggiana
Greater bird-of-paradise, Paradisaea apoda

Ifritas
Order: PasseriformesFamily: Ifritidae

The ifritas are a small and insectivorous passerine  currently placed in the monotypic family, Ifritidae. Previously, the ifrit has been placed in a plethora of families including Cinclosomatidae or Monarchidae. They are considered an ancient relic species endemic to New Guinea.

Blue-capped ifrita, Ifrita kowaldi

Monarch flycatchers

Order: PasseriformesFamily: Monarchidae

The monarch flycatchers are small to medium-sized insectivorous passerines which hunt by flycatching.

Golden monarch, Carterornis chrysomela
Island monarch, Monarcha cinerascens
Chestnut-bellied monarch, Monarcha castaneiventris
Bougainville monarch, Monarcha erythrostictus
Black-faced monarch, Monarcha melanopsis
Black-winged monarch, Monarcha frater
Fan-tailed monarch, Symposiachrus axillaris
Rufous monarch, Symposiachrus rubiensis
Spectacled monarch, Symposiachrus trivirgatus
Hooded monarch, Symposiachrus manadensis
Manus monarch, Symposiachrus infelix (E)
White-breasted monarch, Symposiachrus menckei (E)
Black-tailed monarch, Symposiachrus verticalis (E)
Black-and-white monarch, Symposiachrus barbatus
Spot-winged monarch, Symposiachrus guttula
Frilled monarch, Arses telescopthalmus
Ochre-collared monarch, Arses insularis
Magpie-lark, Grallina cyanoleuca
Torrent-lark, Grallina bruijni
Leaden flycatcher, Myiagra rubecula
Steel-blue flycatcher, Myiagra ferrocyanea
Broad-billed flycatcher, Myiagra ruficollis
Satin flycatcher, Myiagra cyanoleuca
Restless flycatcher, Myiagra inquieta
Paperbark flycatcher, Myiagra nana
Shining flycatcher, Myiagra alecto
Dull flycatcher, Myiagra hebetior (E)

Melampittas
Order: PasseriformesFamily: Melampittidae

They are little studied and before being established as a family in 2014 their taxonomic relationships with other birds were uncertain, being considered at one time related variously to the pittas, Old World babblers and birds-of-paradise.

Lesser melampitta, Melampitta lugubris
Greater melampitta, Melampitta gigantea

Shrikes
Order: PasseriformesFamily: Laniidae

Shrikes are passerine birds known for their habit of catching other birds and small animals and impaling the uneaten portions of their bodies on thorns. A typical shrike's beak is hooked, like a bird of prey.

Brown shrike, Lanius cristatus
Long-tailed shrike, Lanius schach

Crows, jays, and magpies
Order: PasseriformesFamily: Corvidae

The family Corvidae includes crows, ravens, jays, choughs, magpies, treepies, nutcrackers and ground jays. Corvids are above average in size among the Passeriformes, and some of the larger species show high levels of intelligence.

Guadalcanal crow, Corvus woodfordi
Bougainville crow, Corvus meeki
Gray crow, Corvus tristis
Torresian crow, Corvus orru
Bismarck crow, Corvus insularis

Satinbirds
Order: PasseriformesFamily: Cnemophilidae

They are a family of passerine birds which consists of four species found in the mountain forests of New Guinea. They were originally thought to be part of the birds-of-paradise family Paradisaeidae until genetic research suggested that the birds are not closely related to birds-of-paradise at all and are perhaps closer to berry peckers and longbills (Melanocharitidae). The current evidence suggests that their closest relatives may be the cuckoo-shrikes (Campephagidae).

Loria's satinbird, Cnemophilus loriae
Crested satinbird, Cnemophilus macgregorii
Yellow-breasted satinbird, Loboparadisea sericea

Berrypeckers and longbills
Order: PasseriformesFamily: Melanocharitidae

The Melanocharitidae are medium-sized birds which feed on fruit and some insects and other invertebrates. They have drab plumage in greys, browns or black and white. The berrypeckers resemble stout short-billed honeyeaters, and the longbills are like drab sunbirds.

Obscure berrypecker, Melanocharis arfakiana
Black berrypecker, Melanocharis nigra
Mid-mountain berrypecker, Melanocharis longicauda
Fan-tailed berrypecker, Melanocharis versteri
Streaked berrypecker, Melanocharis striativentris
Spotted berrypecker, Melanocharis crassirostris
Yellow-bellied longbill, Toxorhamphus novaeguineae
Slaty-chinned longbill, Toxorhamphus poliopterus
Spectacled longbill, Oedistoma iliolophus
Pygmy longbill, Oedistoma pygmaeum

Australasian robins
Order: PasseriformesFamily: Petroicidae

Most species of Petroicidae have a stocky build with a large rounded head, a short straight bill and rounded wingtips. They occupy a wide range of wooded habitats, from subalpine to tropical rainforest, and mangrove swamp to semi-arid scrubland. All are primarily insectivores, although a few supplement their diet with seeds.

Greater ground-robin, Amalocichla sclateriana
Lesser ground-robin, Amalocichla incerta
Torrent flycatcher, Monachella muelleriana
Jacky-winter, Microeca fascinans
Lemon-bellied flycatcher, Microeca flavigaster
Yellow-legged flycatcher, Microeca griseoceps
Olive flyrobin, Microeca flavovirescens
Papuan flycatcher, Microeca papuana
Garnet robin, Eugerygone rubra
Subalpine robin, Petroica bivittata
Pacific robin, Petroica pusilla
White-faced robin, Tregellasia leucops
Mangrove robin, Eopsaltria pulverulenta
Black-chinned robin, Poecilodryas brachyura
Black-sided robin, Poecilodryas hypoleuca
Olive-yellow robin, Poecilodryas placens
Black-throated robin, Poecilodryas albonotata
White-winged robin, Peneothello sigillatus
White-rumped robin, Peneothello bimaculatus
Blue-gray robin, Peneothello cyanus
Ashy robin, Heteromyias albispecularis
Green-backed robin, Pachycephalopsis hattamensis
White-eyed robin, Pachycephalopsis poliosoma
Papuan scrub-robin, Drymodes beccarii (E)

Larks
Order: PasseriformesFamily: Alaudidae

Larks are small terrestrial birds with often extravagant songs and display flights. Most larks are fairly dull in appearance. Their food is insects and seeds.

Horsfield’s bushlark, Mirafra javanica

Cisticolas and allies
Order: PasseriformesFamily: Cisticolidae

The Cisticolidae are warblers found mainly in warmer southern regions of the Old World. They are generally very small birds of drab brown or grey appearance found in open country such as grassland or scrub.

Zitting cisticola, Cisticola juncidis
Golden-headed cisticola, Cisticola exilis

Reed warblers and allies
Order: PasseriformesFamily: Acrocephalidae

The members of this family are usually rather large for "warblers". Most are rather plain olivaceous brown above with much yellow to beige below. They are usually found in open woodland, reedbeds, or tall grass. The family occurs mostly in southern to western Eurasia and surroundings, but it also ranges far into the Pacific, with some species in Africa.

Oriental reed warbler, Acrocephalus orientalis
Clamorous reed warbler, Acrocephalus stentoreus
Australian reed warbler, Acrocephalus australis

Grassbirds and allies

Order: PasseriformesFamily: Locustellidae

Locustellidae are a family of small insectivorous songbirds found mainly in Eurasia, Africa, and the Australian region. They are smallish birds with tails that are usually long and pointed, and tend to be drab brownish or buffy all over.

Fly River grassbird, Poodytes albolimbatus
Little grassbird, Poodytes gramineus
Bismarck thicketbird, Cincloramphus grosvenori (E)
Rusty thicketbird, Cincloramphus rubiginosus (E)
Bougainville thicketbird, Cincloramphus llaneae (E)
Guadalcanal thicketbird, Cincloramphus whitneyi
Tawny grassbird, Cincloramphus timoriensis
Papuan grassbird, Cincloramphus macrurus
Gray's grasshopper warbler, Helopsaltes fasciolatus

Swallows
Order: PasseriformesFamily: Hirundinidae

The family Hirundinidae is adapted to aerial feeding. They have a slender streamlined body, long pointed wings and a short bill with a wide gape. The feet are adapted to perching rather than walking, and the front toes are partially joined at the base.

Bank swallow, Riparia riparia
Barn swallow, Hirundo rustica
Welcome swallow, Hirundo neoxena
Pacific swallow, Hirundo tahitica
Red-rumped swallow, Cecropis daurica
Striated swallow, Cecropis striolata
Fairy martin, Petrochelidon ariel
Tree martin, Petrochelidon nigricans

Bulbuls
Order: PasseriformesFamily: Pycnonotidae

Bulbuls are medium-sized songbirds. Some are colourful with yellow, red or orange vents, cheeks, throats or supercilia, but most are drab, with uniform olive-brown to black plumage. Some species have distinct crests.

Sooty-headed bulbul, Pycnonotus aurigaster (A)

Leaf warblers
Order: PasseriformesFamily: Phylloscopidae

Leaf warblers are a family of small insectivorous birds found mostly in Eurasia and ranging into Wallacea and Africa. The species are of various sizes, often green-plumaged above and yellow below, or more subdued with greyish-green to greyish-brown colours.

Japanese leaf warbler, Phylloscopus xanthodryas (A)
Arctic warbler, Phylloscopus borealis (A)
Kamchatka leaf warbler, Phylloscopus examinandus (A)
Mountain warbler, Phylloscopus trivirgatus
Island leaf warbler, Phylloscopus poliocephalus

Bush warblers and allies
Order: PasseriformesFamily: Scotocercidae

The members of this family are found throughout Africa, Asia, and Polynesia. Their taxonomy is in flux, and some authorities place some genera in other families.

Odedi, Horornis haddeni (E)

White-eyes, yuhinas, and allies
Order: PasseriformesFamily: Zosteropidae

The white-eyes are small and mostly undistinguished, their plumage above being generally some dull colour like greenish-olive, but some species have a white or bright yellow throat, breast or lower parts, and several have buff flanks. As their name suggests, many species have a white ring around each eye.

Lemon-bellied white-eye, Zosterops chloris
Ashy-bellied white-eye, Zosterops citrinella
Black-crowned white-eye, Zosterops atrifrons
Black-fronted white-eye, Zosterops minor
Tagula white-eye, Zosterops meeki (E)
Black-headed white-eye, Zosterops hypoxanthus (E)
Capped white-eye, Zosterops fuscicapilla
New Guinea white-eye, Zosterops novaeguineae
Louisiade white-eye, Zosterops griseotinctus (E)
Yellow-throated white-eye, Zosterops metcalfii
Gray-throated white-eye, Zosterops rendovae (E)

Starlings
Order: PasseriformesFamily: Sturnidae

Starlings are small to medium-sized passerine birds. Their flight is strong and direct and they are very gregarious. Their preferred habitat is fairly open country. They eat insects and fruit. Plumage is typically dark with a metallic sheen.

Metallic starling, Aplonis metallica
Yellow-eyed starling, Aplonis mystacea
Atoll starling, Aplonis feadensis
White-eyed starling, Aplonis brunneicapillus
Brown-winged starling, Aplonis grandis
Singing starling, Aplonis cantoroides
Moluccan starling, Aplonis mysolensis
Yellow-faced myna, Mino dumontii
Golden myna, Mino anais
Long-tailed myna, Mino kreffti
Common hill myna, Gracula religiosa
European starling, Sturnus vulgaris
Common myna, Acridotheres tristis (I)

Thrushes and allies
Order: PasseriformesFamily: Turdidae

The thrushes are a group of passerine birds that occur mainly in the Old World. They are plump, soft plumaged, small to medium-sized insectivores or sometimes omnivores, often feeding on the ground. Many have attractive songs.

Scaly thrush, Zoothera dauma
New Britain thrush, Zoothera talaseae (E)
Bougainville thrush, Zoothera atrigena (E)
Russet-tailed thrush, Zoothera heinei
Island thrush, Turdus poliocephalus

Old World flycatchers
Order: PasseriformesFamily: Muscicapidae

Old World flycatchers are a large group of small passerine birds native to the Old World. They are mainly small arboreal insectivores. The appearance of these birds is highly varied, but they mostly have weak songs and harsh calls.

Gray-streaked flycatcher, Muscicapa griseisticta
Siberian rubythroat, Calliope calliope
Blue rock-thrush, Monticola solitarius
Pied bushchat, Saxicola caprataFlowerpeckersOrder: PasseriformesFamily: Dicaeidae

The flowerpeckers are very small, stout, often brightly coloured birds, with short tails, short thick curved bills and tubular tongues.

Olive-crowned flowerpecker, Dicaeum pectorale
Red-capped flowerpecker, Dicaeum geelvinkianum
Louisiade flowerpecker, Dicaeum nitidum (E)
Red-banded flowerpecker, Dicaeum eximium (E)
Midget flowerpecker, Dicaeum aeneum
Mistletoebird, Dicaeum hirundinaceum

Sunbirds and spiderhuntersOrder: PasseriformesFamily: Nectariniidae

The sunbirds and spiderhunters are very small passerine birds which feed largely on nectar, although they will also take insects, especially when feeding young. Flight is fast and direct on their short wings. Most species can take nectar by hovering like a hummingbird, but usually perch to feed.

Black sunbird, Leptocoma sericea
Olive-backed sunbird, Cinnyris jugularis

Waxbills and alliesOrder: PasseriformesFamily: Estrildidae

The estrildid finches are small passerine birds of the Old World tropics and Australasia. They are gregarious and often colonial seed eaters with short thick but pointed bills. They are all similar in structure and habits, but have wide variation in plumage colours and patterns.

Mountain firetail, Oreostruthus fuliginosus
Red-browed firetail, Neochmia temporalis
Crimson finch, Neochmia phaeton
Blue-faced parrotfinch, Erythrura trichroa
Papuan parrotfinch, Erythrura papuana
Streak-headed munia, Mayrimunia tristissima
White-spotted munia, Mayrimunia leucosticta
Grand munia, Lonchura grandis
Gray-crowned munia, Lonchura nevermanni
Hooded munia, Lonchura spectabilis
Gray-headed munia, Lonchura caniceps
Mottled munia, Lonchura hunsteini (E)
New Ireland munia, Lonchura forbesi (E)
New Hanover munia, Lonchura nigerrima (E)
Chestnut-breasted munia, Lonchura castaneothorax
Black munia, Lonchura stygia
Snow Mountain munia, Lonchura montana
Alpine munia, Lonchura monticola (E)
Bismarck munia, Lonchura melaena

Old World sparrowsOrder: PasseriformesFamily: Passeridae

Old World sparrows are small passerine birds. In general, sparrows tend to be small, plump, brown or grey birds with short tails and short powerful beaks. Sparrows are seed eaters, but they also consume small insects.

House sparrow, Passer domesticus (I)
Eurasian tree sparrow, Passer montanus (A)

Wagtails and pipitsOrder: PasseriformesFamily''': Motacillidae

Motacillidae is a family of small passerine birds with medium to long tails. They include the wagtails, longclaws and pipits. They are slender, ground feeding insectivores of open country.

Gray wagtail, Motacilla cinereaWestern yellow wagtail, Motacilla flavaEastern yellow wagtail, Motacilla tschutschensisAustralian pipit, Anthus australisPaddyfield pipit, Anthus rufulus (A)
Alpine pipit, Anthus gutturalis''

See also
List of birds
Lists of birds by region

References

New Guinea Birds

Papua New Guinea
 
Birds